The Royal Dragoons (1st Dragoons) was a heavy cavalry regiment of the British Army. The regiment was formed in 1661 as the Tangier Horse. It served for three centuries and was in action during the First and the Second World Wars. It was amalgamated with the Royal Horse Guards to form The Blues and Royals in 1969.

History

Formation
The regiment was first raised as a single troop of veterans of the Parliamentary Army in 1661, shortly thereafter expanded to four troops as the Tangier Horse, taking the name from their service in the Garrison of Tangier. For the next few years, the regiment defended Tangier, which had been acquired by the English Crown through the marriage of King Charles II to Catherine of Braganza in April 1662, from Moorish cavalry.

The regiment consisted of four troops, three of which were originally troops in the English Regiment of Light Horse in France attached to the French army of Louis XIV and under the command of Sir Henry Jones. They were constituted in 1672 and, after Jones was killed during the siege of Maastricht in 1673 while serving with the Duke of Monmouth, command passed to the Duke. The regiment was ranked as the 1st Dragoons, the oldest cavalry regiment of the line, in 1674. The regiment was recalled to England in 1678 (it was disbanded in France and reformed in England with most of the same officers) with the expectation of fighting in a war against France. In early 1679, it was disbanded and then reformed in June of that year as Gerard's Regiment of Horse (its colonel being Charles Gerard), with most of the same officers and men, to police the Covenanters in Scotland. The regiment was disbanded in late 1679 and three of its captains, John Coy, Thomas Langston and Charles Nedby, along with their troopers, went out to Tangier in 1680 as reinforcements. When they returned in 1683, they joined what became a new permanent regiment of the Royal Dragoons.

Early wars

On their return to England in 1683, the three troops were joined with three newly raised troops and titled The King's Own Royal Regiment of Dragoons, named for Charles II. In 1690, the regiment was renamed as simply The Royal Regiment of Dragoons. It fought at the Battle of the Boyne in July 1690 and the Siege of Limerick in August 1690 during the Williamite War in Ireland.

The regiment saw action at the Battle of Dettingen in June 1743 and at the Battle of Fontenoy in May 1745 during the War of the Austrian Succession, and having been formally titled as the 1st (Royal) Regiment of Dragoons in 1751, it took part in the Raid on St Malo in June 1758, the Raid on Cherbourg in August 1758 and the Battle of Warburg in July 1760 during the Seven Years' War.

The regiment also fought at the Battle of Beaumont in April 1794 and the Battle of Willems in May 1794 during the Flanders Campaign. It served under Viscount Wellesley, as the rearguard during the retreat to the Lines of Torres Vedras in September 1810, and charged the enemy at the Battle of Fuentes de Oñoro in May 1811 during the Peninsular War. The regiment also took part in the charge of the Union Brigade under the command of Major-General William Ponsonby at the Battle of Waterloo in June 1815 during the Hundred Days Campaign. Captain Alexander Kennedy Clark, an officer in the regiment, captured the French Imperial Eagle of the 105th Line Infantry Regiment during the battle.

In 1816 a detachment of the regiment was involved with suppressing the Littleport riots.

The regiment, under the command of Lieutenant-Colonel John Yorke, also took part in the charge of the heavy brigade at the Battle of Balaclava in October 1854 during the Crimean War. Having been re-titled the 1st (Royal) Dragoons in 1877, the regiment also saw action at the Battle of Abu Klea in January 1885 during the Mahdist War.

20th century wars
After the outbreak of the Second Boer War in October 1899, the regiment was sent to South Africa where it arrived at Durban in November. It formed part of the force sent to relieve Ladysmith, taking part in the battles of Colenso (December 1899), Spion Kop (January 1900), and the Tugela Heights (February 1900). In January 1900, the regiment was part of a force that set out to discover the western flank of the Boer lines. It was able to ambush a column of about 200 Boers near Acton Homes and successfully trapped about 40 of them. From June 1900 to April 1901 the regiment was employed guarding the Buffalo River and the Transvaal approaches to the Drakensberg, under the command of Lieutenant Colonel Sclater-Booth. During the rest of the war they were employed in the Transvaal and in the Orange River Colony. After their return, they were stationed at Shorncliffe, where they were inspected by their Colonel in Chief Emperor Wilhelm II in November 1902.

The regiment, which had been serving at Potchefstroom in South Africa when the First World War started, returned to the UK and then landed at Ostend as part of the 6th Cavalry Brigade in the 3rd Cavalry Division in October 1914 for service on the Western Front. It took part in the First Battle of Ypres in October 1914, the Second Battle of Ypres in April 1915, the Battle of Loos in September 1915 and the advance to the Hindenburg Line in 1917.

The regiment retitled as the 1st The Royal Dragoons in 1921. It was deployed to Egypt in 1927, to Secunderabad in India in 1929 and to Palestine in 1938.

The regiment mechanised shortly after the outbreak of the Second World War and was transferred to the Royal Armoured Corps in 1940. It was deployed to the Western Desert as the Reconnaissance Regiment for the 1st Armoured Division in December 1941; its men were the first troops to enter Benghazi later that month, before seeing action again at the Battle of Gazala in May 1942. It became the Reconnaissance Regiment for the 10th Armoured Division in September 1942 and helped to destroy the enemy supply columns at the Second Battle of El Alamein in October 1942. The regiment saw action during the Allied invasion of Sicily in July 1943 and then briefly took part in the Italian campaign before returning home in December 1943 and taking part in the Normandy landings in July 1944. The regiment took part in the advance to the River Elbe and, after taking 10,000 enemy prisoners, liberated Copenhagen in May 1945.

Post-war
The regiment moved to Eutin in Schleswig-Holstein in November 1945 and to Dale Barracks in Chester in November 1950. It deployed troops to Egypt in February 1951 and then moved to Combermere Barracks in Wesendorf in May 1954 and to Harewood Barracks in Herford in August 1957. It returned to the UK in September 1959 from where it deployed troops to Aden in November 1959 and to Malaya in December 1960. The regiment survived the immediate post-war reduction in forces, and was re-titled as The Royal Dragoons (1st Dragoons) in 1961. It returned home in October 1962 and then deployed troops to Cyprus in February 1964 before transferring to Hobart Barracks in Detmold in January 1965. It amalgamated with the Royal Horse Guards (The Blues), to form The Blues and Royals in 1969.

Regimental museum
The regimental collection is held by the Household Cavalry Museum which is based at Horse Guards in London.

Battle honours
The regiments battle honours were as follows:
Early Wars: Tangier 1662–80, Dettingen, Warburg, Beaumont, Willems, Fuentes d'Onor, Peninsula, Waterloo, Balaklava, Sevastopol, Relief of Ladysmith, South Africa 1899–1902
The Great War: Ypres 1914 '15, Langemarck 1914, Gheluvelt, Nonne Bosschen, Frezenberg, Loos, Arras 1917, Scarpe 1917, Somme 1918, St. Quentin, Avre, Amiens, Hindenburg Line, Beaurevoir, Cambrai 1918, Pursuit to Mons, France and Flanders 1914–18
The Second World War: Nederrijn, Veghel, Rhine, North-West Europe 1944–45, Syria 1941, Msus, Gazala, Knightsbridge, Defence of Alamein Line, El Alamein, El Agheila, Advance on Tripoli, North Africa 1941–43, Sicily 1943, Italy 1943

Victoria Cross
Second Lieutenant John Spencer Dunville, First World War (24–25 June 1917)

Colonels-in-Chief
The Colonels-in-Chief of the regiment were as follows:
1894–1914 HIM Wilhelm II, German Emperor and King of Prussia, KG [terminated 1914]
1922 	F.M. HM King George V
1936 	F.M. HM King George VI

Colonels – with other names for the regiment
The colonels of the regiment were as follows:
 Tangier Horse – (1661) or 1st Dragoons – (1674). 
1661–1663 Henry Mordaunt, 2nd Earl of Peterborough (Captain & Colonel)
1663–1664 Andrew Rutherford, 1st Earl of Teviot (Captain & Colonel) (killed at the Battle of Tangier)
1664–1666 Sir John Bridges (Captain & Colonel)
1666–1668 Edward Witham (Captain)
1668–1675 Alexander Mackenzie (Lieut)
1675–1683 Alexander Mackenzie (Captain)

The King's Own Royal Regiment of Dragoons – (1683)
 1683–1685 General John, Lord Churchill KG. app. 19 November 1683 – Lord Churchill's Dragoons
 1685–1688 Colonel Edward, Viscount Cornbury. app. 1 August 1685 – Hyde's Dragoons or Lord Cornbury's Dragoons
 1688 Colonel Richard Clifford. app. 24 November 1688 – Clifford's Dragoons
 1688–1689 Colonel Edward, Viscount Cornbury. re-app. 31 December 1688 – Lord Cornbury's Dragoons
 1689–1690 Colonel Anthony Heyford. app. 1 July 1689 – Heyford's Dragoons

The Royal Regiment of Dragoons – (1690)
 1690–1697 Brigadier-General Edward Mathews. app. 21 June 1690 – Mathews' Dragoons
 1697–1715 Lieutenant-General Thomas, Baron Raby KG. app.30 May 1697 – Wentworth's Dragoons or Lord Raby's Dragoons or Earl of Strafford's Dragoons
 1715–1721 Field Marshal Richard, Viscount Cobham. app. 13 June 1715 —Temple's Dragoons or Lord Cobham's Dragoons
 1721–1723 Brigadier-General Sir Charles Hotham, 4th Baronet. app. 10 April 1721 – Hotham's Dragoons
 1723–1739 Lieutenant-General Humphrey Gore. app. 12 January 1723 – Gore's Dragoons
 1739–1740 General Charles, Duke of Marlborough KG. app. 1 September 1739 – Spencer's Dragoons, or Sunderland's Dragoons or Duke of Marlborough's Dragoons
 1740–1759 Lieutenant-General Henry Hawley. app. 10 May 1740 – Hawley's Dragoons

On 1 July 1751, a royal warrant provided that in future regiments would not be known by their colonels' names, but by their "number or rank".

1st (Royal) Regiment of Dragoons – (1751)
 1759–1764 Field Marshal Henry Seymour Conway. app. 5 April 1759 
 1764–1794 General Henry, Earl of Pembroke. app. 9 May 1764
 1794–1801 Lieutenant-General Philip Goldsworthy. app. 23 January 1794 
 1801–1829 General Thomas Garth. app. 7 January 1801
 1829–1836 General Lord Robert Edward Henry Somerset GCB. app. 3 November 1829
 1836–1837 Major-General Hon. Sir Frederick Cavendish Ponsonby GCMG KCB KCH. app. 31 March 1836
 1837–1842 Lieutenant-General Sir Hussey, Baron Vivian GCB GCH. app. 20 January 1837
 1842–1869 General Sir Arthur Benjamin Clifton GCB KCH. app. 30 August 1842
 1869–1889 General Charles Philip de Ainslie. app. 8 March 1869

1st (Royal) Dragoons – (1877)
1889–1890 General John Yorke CB. app. 24 Mar 1889
1890–1900 Lieutenant-General Sir Frederick Marshall KCMG. app. 29 March 1890
1900–1912 Major-General Francis Shirley Russell CMG. app. 9 June 1900
1912–1919 Major-General Hon. John Edward Lindley. app. 22 March 1912
1919–1931 Major-General Sir John Francis Burn-Murdoch KCVO CB CMG CBE. app. 16 April 1919

1st The Royal Dragoons – (1921)
1931–1946 Brigadier-General Sir Ernest Makins KBE CB DSO. app. 22 Jan 1931
1946–1954 Colonel Francis William Wilson-Fitzgerald DSO MC. app. 13 October 1946
1954–1964 Brigadier Anthony Hilton Pepys DSO. app. 9 December 1954
1964–1969 General Sir Geoffrey Richard Desmond Fitzpatrick KCB DSO MBE MC. app. 9 December 1964

In 1969 the regiment amalgamated with Royal Horse Guards (The Blues), to form The Blues and Royals (Royal Horse Guards and 1st Dragoons).

Commanding Officers

Among the Commanding Officers have been:
Lt.-Col. John Francis Burn-Murdoch, CB: February 1898 – February 1902
Lt.-Col. George Limbrey Sclater-Booth, 2nd Baron Basing, CB: February 1902 – February 1906
Lt.-Col. Henry de Beauvoir De Lisle, CB, DSO: February 1906 – 1909
Lt.-Col. Ernest Makins, DSO: January 1910 – ?
Lt.-Col. Frederick Courtenay Longuet Hulton

Lt.-Col. Philip B. Fielden: January 1959 – July 1961
Lt.-Col. Kenneth F. Timbrell: July 1961 – July 1962
Lt.-Col. Richard E. Worsley: July 1962 – December 1965
Lt.-Col. Peter D. Reid: December 1965 – January 1968
Lt.-Col. Richard M. H. Vickers: January 1968 – March 1969

See also
British cavalry during the First World War

Notes

References

Further reading
 
 
 
 
 
 
 
 
 

Dragoon regiments of the British Army
1661 establishments in England
1969 disestablishments in the United Kingdom
Household Cavalry
Royal Dragoons 001
D1
Military units and formations disestablished in 1969
Military units and formations established in 1661